

Medalists

Recurve

Medal table

Notes

References
 The Official Report, XVI Southeast Asian Games, Manila 1991

1991
1991 Southeast Asian Games events
Southeast Asian Games
Archery competitions in the Philippines